Magrão (Portuguese: "skinny") may refer to:

Association football
Magrão (footballer, born 1974), Giuliano Tadeo Aranda, Brazilian striker
Magrão (footballer, born 1977), Alessandro Beti Rosa, Brazilian goalkeeper
Magrão (footballer, born 1978), Márcio Rodrigues, Brazilian defensive midfielder
Magrão (footballer, born 1984), Daniel de Jesus dos Santos, Brazilian forward
Adriano Magrão (born 1981), Adriano Bizerra Melo, Brazilian striker
Fábio Magrão (born 1977), Fábio Joaquim Maciel da Silva, Brazilian midfielder
Gérson Magrão (born 1985), Gérson Alencar de Lima Júnior, Brazilian midfielder
Willian Magrão (born 1987), Willian Henrique Antunes, Brazilian defensive midfielder

Others
Marcelo Guimarães (born 1983), nicknamed Magrão, Brazilian mixed martial artist
MC Lord Magrão (born 1978), Brazilian musician and former member of Guillemots